Streptomyces lactacystinicus is a bacterium species from the genus of Streptomyces which has been isolated from soil near a near lake from Inba in Japan. Streptomyces lactacystinicus produces lactacystin and cyslabdan.

See also 
 List of Streptomyces species

References 

 

lactacystinicus
Bacteria described in 2017